Todd Lane Junction, previously called Preston Junction until 1952, was a railway station between Preston and Bamber Bridge which closed to passenger traffic on 7 October 1968. The station was immediately to the north of a triangular junction between lines from Preston, East Lancashire via , and Ormskirk via . The station served as an interchange between the lines. The line from Preston to Bamber Bridge via Todd Lane remained open for freight trains until 4 September 1972 to serve Lostock Hall Gas Works. The track bed is now a public footpath and cycleway.

This line also connected with the Lostock Hall engine and goods yards on the road between Preston and Leyland, which in their heyday were considered amongst the largest yards of their type in Europe.

On construction, the station had three waiting rooms and porters; parcel and ticket offices. It could be reached via steps that linked it with the Todd Lane (road) bridge over the railway. On the other side of the bridge was the wooden signal box. The line also served the Lockstock Hall Gas works and for this purpose was kept open for a number of years after it closed to passenger traffic

Accidents and incidents
On 3 August 1896, a passenger train was in collision with a Lancashire and Yorkshire Railway excursion train at Preston Junction, Lancashire due to the driver of the latter misreading signals which resulted in a collision with another train. One person was killed and seven were injured.

References

Disused railway stations in South Ribble
Beeching closures in England
Former Lancashire and Yorkshire Railway stations
Railway stations in Great Britain opened in 1850
Railway stations in Great Britain closed in 1968
1850 establishments in England
1968 disestablishments in England